The men's singles competition at the 2022 FIL European Luge Championships was held on 22 January 2022.

Results
The first run was held at 11:48 and the second run at 13:30.

References

Men's singles